

The Thaden T-2 was a 1920s American four-seat all-metal cabin monoplane built by the Thaden Metal Aircraft Company of San Francisco, California, USA.

Design and development
The Thaden Metal Aircraft Company was formed by Herbert von Thaden, a former United States Army Signal Corps pilot and engineer, to work on developing the first American all-metal aircraft. Following on from the strut-braced T-1 the T-2 was a smaller four-seat high-wing cantilever monoplane with flaps, powered by a  Comet radial engine.

Specifications

See also

Thaden T-1
Thaden T-4

References

Bibliography

1920s United States civil utility aircraft
Economy of San Francisco
Single-engined tractor aircraft
High-wing aircraft
Aircraft first flown in 1928